The House of the Little Sisters of the Poor (Spanish: Asilo de Hermanitas de los Pobres), also known as Mi Casa, is a residence for elderly people in the Salamanca district of Madrid, Spain. It is run by the Little Sisters of the Poor, who also run a similarly named facility in the Chamberi district.

The building was designed by Ricardo Garcia Guereta, and has neo-mudejar features. It has been protected by heritage listing, Bien de Interés Cultural, since 1996.

References

External links 

Buildings and structures in Salamanca District, Madrid
Bien de Interés Cultural landmarks in Madrid